Yang Seong-hwan (born 9 September 1994) is a Korean footballer plays as a right-back.

Career statistics

Club

Notes

References

1994 births
Living people
South Korean footballers
South Korean expatriate footballers
Association football defenders
Liga Portugal 2 players
K4 League players
Gangwon FC players
Vitória F.C. players
Académico de Viseu F.C. players
South Korean expatriate sportspeople in Portugal
Expatriate footballers in Portugal